Václav Jaroslav Karel Pinkava (9 December 1926 – 13 August 1995), better known by his pen name Jan Křesadlo, was a Czech psychologist who was also a prizewinning novelist and poet.

An anti-communist, Pinkava emigrated to Britain with his wife and four children following the 1968 invasion of Czechoslovakia by the Soviet-led armies of the Warsaw pact. He worked as a clinical psychologist until his early retirement in 1982, when he turned to full-time writing. His first novel "Mrchopěvci" (GraveLarks) was published by Josef Škvorecký's emigre publishing house 68 Publishers, and earned the 1984 Egon Hostovský prize.

He chose his pseudonym (which means firesteel) partly because it contains the uniquely Czech sound ř; in addition, he was fond of creating more pseudonyms such as Jake Rolands (an anagram), J. K. Klement (after his grandfather, for translations into English), Juraj Hron (for his Slovak-Moravian writings), Ferdinand Lučovický z Lučovic a na Suchým dole (for his music), Kamil Troud (for his illustrations), Ἰωάννης Πυρεῖα (for his Astronautilia), and more.

Pinkava was also active in choral music, composing (among others) a Glagolitic Mass. As well, he worked in mathematical logic, discovering the many-valued logic algebra which bears his name.

A polymath and polyglot, Pinkava was fond of setting intense goals for himself, such as translating Jaroslav Seifert's interwoven sonnet cycle about Prague, 'A Wreath of Sonnets'. He published a collection of his own poems in seven languages. Perhaps his most staggering achievement is ΑΣΤΡΟΝΑΥΤΙΛΙΑ Hvězdoplavba, a 6575-line science fiction epic poem, an odyssey in classical Homeric Greek, with its parallel hexameter translation into Czech. This was published shortly after his death, in a limited edition.
Only his first, prize-winning novel has been published in English translation, as GraveLarks in a bilingual edition in 1999 and in a revised edition in 2015

He is the father of film director Jan Pinkava who received an Oscar for Geri's Game in 1998 and also illustrated GraveLarks.

External links 
 , in Czech and English 
 English links for easy reference:
 Illustrative Translations
 a couple of Critics' views, in English
 by Helena Kupcová
 by Vladimír Novotný
 About Astronautilia
 by Wallace McLeod, in English (Amazon entry)
 illustrative sample transcribed by William Annis
 About his Scientific works
 Biographical reference
 Citations and Articles
 Section on  Pinkava logics in the Encyclopedia of Optimization

Czech novelists
Czech male novelists
Czech poets
Czech male poets
Czech psychologists
Czechoslovak emigrants to England
Writers from Prague
1926 births
1995 deaths
20th-century Czech novelists
20th-century Czech poets
Czech emigrants to England
20th-century male writers
20th-century psychologists